Sargento Cabral is a  department of Chaco Province in Argentina, named after Juan Bautista Cabral (Sergeant Cabral), a soldier in the Independence Wars.

Settlements
Capitán Solari
Colonia Elisa
Colonias Unidas
Ingeniero Barbet
Las Garcitas

References

External links
Colonia Elisa Municipal Website (Spanish)

Departments of Chaco Province